Ḥají Mullá ʻAlí-Akbar S͟hahmírzádí (‎ 18421910), known as Ḥají Ák͟húnd, was an eminent follower of Baháʼu'lláh, the founder of the Baháʼí Faith. He was appointed a Hand of the Cause, and identified as one of the nineteen Apostles of Baháʼu'lláh.

Background 

Hají Ákhúnd was born in the village of S͟hahmírzád, Iran. He was the son of Mullá Abbas who was a Bábí. Hají Ákhúnd thus grew up in a household where there was some mention of this new religion. After some preliminary studies, he went to Mashhad to attend a religious college. In 1861, he encountered Bábís and converted to the Báb's religion, which caused his immediate expulsion from the college and the city.

Imprisonment 

Upon his return to his home village, he was also expelled and sent away by the local clergy. He settled in Tihrán, where he accepted Baháʼu'lláh and became a Baháʼí. It is recorded that when there was an outburst against the Baháʼís in Tihrán, he would wrap his cloak around himself and sit waiting for the guards to come and arrest him.

He was arrested many times in Tihrán: in 1886 on the orders of Mulla ʻAli Kani, in 1872 for seven months by Nayibu's-Saltanih, in 1882 for two years by Nayibu's-Saltanih, in 1887, and in 1891 for two years with Hájí Amín.

Travels 

He visited ʻAkká, where Baháʼu'lláh and his family were prisoners, on three occasions: in 1873, 1888, and 1899. He was given the task of transferring the remains of the Báb from various secret locations to ʻAkká, where they remained for several years until they were eventually entombed in the Shrine of the Báb. He was one of the four Hands of the Cause appointed by Baháʼu'lláh himself, and was responsible for much of the Baháʼí activity in Iran until his death on 4 March, 1910.

Notes

References

External links 
Biography by Moojan Momen.

1842 births
1910 deaths
Apostles of Baháʼu'lláh
Hands of the Cause
Iranian Bahá'ís
Converts to the Bahá'í Faith from Shia Islam
19th-century Bahá'ís
20th-century Bahá'ís